Northumberland Fire and Rescue Service is the statutory fire and rescue service for the county of Northumberland in North East England. Its headquarters are co-located with West Hartford fire station in Cramlington.

History

The Northumberland Fire Brigade (NFB) was formed in 1948 from the many local fire services located in the traditional county of Northumbria, between the Tyne and the Tweed rivers. The Local Government Reorganisation act (1971), which came into effect in 1974, saw the transfer of four of the busiest NFB stations (Gosforth, Newburn, Wallsend and Whitley Bay), into the newly formed Tyne and Wear Fire and Rescue Service. This also prompted a name change to Northumberland County Fire Brigade.

The current name was adopted in 1982, reflecting the type of callouts the service was receiving. Between 1966 and 2010, the brigade's headquarters had been in Morpeth, however, in June 2010, a new headquarters building and fire station was opened up at West Hartford in Cramlington.
The headquarters, together with a new fire station at Pegswood and other fire stations across the North East region, were constructed as part of a £27million private finance initiative (PFI) project initiated by the North East Fire and Rescue Authority.

Annual callouts for the service average around 3,400. In the period from October 2017 to September 2018, Northumberland had 3,404 callouts of which 44% were fires, 37% were false alarms, and 19% were non-fire incidents.

Performance
In 2018/2019, every fire and rescue service in England and Wales was subjected to a statutory inspection by Her Majesty's Inspectorate of Constabulary and Fire & Rescue Services (HIMCFRS). Another cycle of inspections was carried out starting in 2021.The inspections investigate how well the service performs in each of three areas. On a scale of outstanding, good, requires improvement and inadequate, Northumberland Fire and Rescue Service was rated as follows:

Fire stations and appliances 
The service's fire stations, which are crewed by wholetime firefighters, retained firefighters, or a combination of the two, are listed below.
Some of the stations are shared with other organisations. 

The fire station at Haydon Bridge closed in 2016.

See also
Fire service in the United Kingdom
List of British firefighters killed in the line of duty

References

Sources

External links

Northumberland Fire and Rescue Service at HMICFRS

Fire and rescue services of England
Fire and Rescue Service